The tetrathionate anion, is a sulfur oxyanion derived from the compound tetrathionic acid, H2S4O6. Two of the sulfur atoms present in the ion are in oxidation state 0 and two are in oxidation state +5. Tetrathionate is one of the polythionates, a family of anions with the formula [Sn(SO3)2]2−. Its IUPAC name is 2-(dithioperoxy)disulfate, and the name of its corresponding acid is 2-(dithioperoxy)disulfuric acid. The Chemical Abstracts Service identifies tetrathionate by the CAS Number 15536-54-6.

Formation
Tetrathionate is a product of the oxidation of thiosulfate, by iodine, I2:
2 + I2 →  + 2I−

Structure
Tetrathionate's structure can be visualized by following three edges of a rectangular cuboid, as in the diagram below. Dihedral S–S–S–S angles approaching 90° are common in polysulfides.

Compounds
Compounds containing the tetrathionate anion include sodium tetrathionate, Na2S4O6, potassium tetrathionate, K2S4O6, and barium tetrathionate dihydrate, BaS4O6·2H2O.

Properties
As other species of sulfur at intermediate oxidation state, such as thiosulfate, tetrathionate can be responsible for the pitting corrosion of carbon steel and stainless steel.

Tetrathionate has also been found to serve as a terminal electron acceptor for Salmonella enterica serotype Typhimurium, whereas existing thiosulfate in the small intestines of mammals is oxidized by reactive oxygen species released by the immune system (mainly NADPH oxidase produced superoxide) to form tetrathionate. This aids in the growth of the bacterium, helped by the inflammatory response.

See also
 Corrosion
 Dithionite
 Polysulfides
 Thiosulfate

References

Corrosion
Sulfur oxyanions